Katsiaryna Kulpo (born 23 December 1987) is a Belarusian synchronized swimmer. She competed in the women's duet at the 2008 Olympic Games with Nastassia Parfenava.

Katsiaryna now works as an assistant coach for the Singapore synchronized swimming team.

References 

1987 births
Living people
Belarusian synchronized swimmers
Olympic synchronized swimmers of Belarus
Synchronized swimmers at the 2008 Summer Olympics